The 1918 Southern Intercollegiate Athletic Association football season  was the college football games played by the member schools of the Southern Intercollegiate Athletic Association as part of the 1918 college football season. The season began on September 28.

Georgia Tech was conference champion. Center Bum Day was the first Southern player ever selected to Walter Camp's All-America first-team.

Regular season

SIAA teams in bold.

Week One

Week Two

Week Three

Week Four

Week Five

Week Six

Week Seven

Week Eight

Week Nine

Week Ten

Week Eleven

Awards and honors

All-Americans

E – Bill Fincher, Georgia Tech (MS; TM-1, WC-2)
T – Joe Guyon, Georgia Tech (MS)
C – Bum Day, Georgia Tech (WC-1)
HB – Buck Flowers, Georgia Tech (WC-2 [fb]; TM-2)

References